Federico De Luca (13 April 1914 – 30 May 1991) was an Italian sailor. He competed in the Star event at the 1936 Summer Olympics.

References

External links
 

1914 births
1991 deaths
Italian male sailors (sport)
Olympic sailors of Italy
Sailors at the 1936 Summer Olympics – Star
Sportspeople from Naples